Dunkerton High School is a small rural public high school in Dunkerton, Iowa. It is part of the Dunkerton Community School District which operates PreK-12 education within one facility in Dunkerton.

Athletics
The Raiders compete in the Iowa Star Conference, including the following sports:

Cross County
Volleyball
Football
Basketball 
 Boys' 2-time State Champions (1933, 2004)
Track and Field 
Golf 
Baseball 
Softball

Students from Dunkerton can also participate in bowling with Denver Community School District, and girls' soccer with Waterloo East High School.

Dunkerton High School won the boys' basketball title twice, in 1933 and 2004. During the 2004 championship run, Dunkerton High School also claimed the Sportsmanship Award.

See also
List of high schools in Iowa

References

Public high schools in Iowa
Schools in Black Hawk County, Iowa
1912 establishments in Iowa
Educational institutions established in 1912